Juan Gabriel Uribe Vegalara is a Colombian Conservative Party politician and journalist. He served as the 2nd Minister of Environment and Sustainable Development of Colombia from 2012 to 2013, and as Senator of Colombia from 1998 to 2002. An award-winning journalist, he was Editor-in-chief of El Nuevo Siglo before his appointment as Minister.

Minister of Environment
On 31 August 2012 President Juan Manuel Santos Calderón announced the designation of Uribe as Minister of Environment and Sustainable Development of Colombia in replacement of Frank Pearl González. Uribe was sworn in on 3 September 2012 in a ceremony at the Palace of Nariño.

Personal life
Juan Gabriel is the son of Juan Pablo Uribe Uribe and Elvira Vegalara Rojas. He married Ana María Ruán Perdomo in 1988 with whom he had two children, Pablo and Manuela.

References

Year of birth missing (living people)
Living people
People from Bogotá
University of Los Andes (Colombia) alumni
20th-century Colombian lawyers
Colombian journalists
Male journalists
Colombian Conservative Party politicians
Members of the Senate of Colombia
Ministers of Environment and Sustainable Development of Colombia